Climax is an unincorporated community in Armstrong County, Pennsylvania, United States,  located near New Bethlehem and Clarion. The community is known for its mining industry, namely gypsum. Its ZIP code is 16242.

References

Unincorporated communities in Armstrong County, Pennsylvania
Unincorporated communities in Pennsylvania